The Port of Oakland is a major container ship facility located in Oakland, California, in the San Francisco Bay. It was the first major port on the Pacific Coast of the United States to build terminals for container ships. As of 2011 it was the fifth busiest container port in the United States, behind Long Beach, Los Angeles, Newark, and Savannah. Development of an intermodal container handling system in 2002 after over a decade of planning and construction positions the Port of Oakland for further expansion of the West Coast freight market share. In 2019 it ranked 8th in the United States in the category of containers.

Early history

In 1852, the year of Oakland's incorporation as a town by the California State Legislature, large shipping wharves were constructed along the Oakland Estuary, which was dredged to create a viable shipping channel.  22 years later, in 1874, the previously dredged shipping channel was deepened to make Oakland a deep water port.

In the late 19th century, Southern Pacific was granted exclusive rights to the port. In January 1906 a small work party employed by Western Pacific Railroad quickly built a crossing over the Southern Pacific line to connect the Western Pacific mainline with trackage built on an area of the landfill. This act was protested by Southern Pacific and later upheld in court. The court ruled that all landfills since the date of the agreement did not belong to Southern Pacific, ending their monopoly.

In 1921, a channel was dug thirty feet deep at mean low water from the bay to Brooklyn Basin, a distance of four and three quarters miles, and then a channel twenty-five feet deep around the basin and eighteen feet to San Leandro Bay, an added distance of four miles (6 km). The port was not officially named the Port of Oakland until 1927, under the leadership of the newly organized Board of Port Commissioners.

Under the Rivers and Harbors Act of 1922, the project produced the channel thirty feet deep and 800 feet wide through the shoal south of Yerba Buena Island narrowing to 600 feet at the end of the Oakland jetties, widening of the estuary channel to 600 feet to Webster Street, dredging of the south channel basin to thirty feet and a turning basin, then thirty feet to Park street, at a cost to the federal government of $6 million.

In 1962, the Port of Oakland began to admit container ships.  Container traffic greatly increased the amount of cargo loaded and unloaded in the Port.  By the late 1960s, the Port of Oakland was the second largest port in the world in container tonnage.  However, depth and navigation restrictions in San Francisco Bay limited its capacity, and by the late 1970s it had been supplanted by the Ports of Los Angeles and Long Beach as the major container port on the West Coast.

During an expansion of the Port in the late 1960s, fill material was added to what remained of the old Southern Pacific mole.  The fill came largely from the concurrent excavation of the Berkeley Hills Tunnel during the construction of the BART system. The BART trunk line also crosses over part of the port, and the east portal of the Transbay Tube that carries BART trains from Oakland to San Francisco lies within the Port.

Recent history

One of the main limitations to growth was the inability to transfer containers to rail lines, all cranes historically operating between ocean vessels and trucks.  In the 1980s the Port of Oakland began the evaluation of the development of an intermodal container transfer capability, i.e. facilities that would allow trans-loading of containers from vessels to either trucks or rail modes. The Port retained VZM, Korve Engineering and Earth Metrics to perform engineering and environmental studies to allow detailed engineering to proceed. In 1987, on behalf of the Oakland Port Commission, Allen Broussard led a group of 72 lawyers, port officials including: then-port commissioner Carole Ward Allen, and city officials on a 3-week long trip to China meeting the Mayor of Shanghai, Jiang Zemin (Shanghai is twinned with San Francisco)

Completion of the resulting rail intermodal facility occurred in 2002. That brought the cumulative investment of port expansion to over $1.4 billion since 1962, half of which comprised the intermodal facility.  In the early first decade of the 21st century, the new intermodal rail facility along with severe congestion at the Ports of Los Angeles and Long Beach caused some trans-Pacific shippers to move some of their traffic to the Port of Oakland (especially if the final destination is not in Southern California but lies farther east).  Also, the Port is now reaping the benefits of investment in post-panamax cranes, dredging, and the transfer of military property, which has now been used for expansion.

The $432 million project was finished in September 2009. Some  of mud from the dredging was deposited at the western edge of Middle Harbor Shoreline Park to become a  shallow-water wetlands habitat for marine and shore life. Further dredging followed in 2011, to maintain the navigation channel. Prior to the March 2012 arrival of the MSC Fabiola, the largest container ship ever to enter the San Francisco Bay, the Port of Oakland prepared by checking channel depth and dredging as needed. The ship arrived drawing less than its full draft of  because it held only three-quarters of a load.

Occupy Oakland, part of the Occupy movement, marched to the port on November 2, 2011, and blocked traffic from entering and leaving. In August 2014, the port was the scene of a protest against an Israeli-owned ship by Palestinian supporters opposed to Israeli military actions in the Gaza Strip. The ship's cargo was eventually unloaded after a 4-day standoff. The Jewish Press commented that unless the port found a solution to their "protester problem," there was a good chance the ship's owner and other cargo firms would find safer ports to do business with.

The Port is part of the California’s Green Trade Corridor Marine Highway project, as ships move cargo much greener than trucks and trains. Green Trade Corridor Marine Highway (ports of Oakland-Stockton-West Sacramento) can improve goods movement through Northern California.

In June 2016, The Oakland City Council voted unanimously to ban the handling and storage of both coal and coke at the port. The Oakland City Council voted to ban the handling and storage of coal and coke at the city’s terminals and bulk material facilities. This decision came in opposition to developer Phil Tagami, CEO of the California Capital and Investment Group, financiers of the forthcoming Oakland Bulk and Oversized Terminal.

Oakland Ballpark

The Oakland Athletics of Major League Baseball plan on constructing a new ballpark for the team at Howard Terminal. On April 26, 2018, the Port of Oakland commissioners voted 6-0 unanimously to enter in to a one-year agreement to negotiate exclusively with the Oakland A’s. This agreement allows the A’s to pay the Port $100,000 to study economic feasibility and environmental, transportation and accessibility issues.

On November 28, 2018, The Athletics announced that the team had chosen to build its 34,000-seat new ballpark at the Howard Terminal site at the Port of Oakland.

Oakland International Airport

In addition to its maritime activities, the Port also operates Oakland International Airport. Developed land adjacent to the airport is also overseen by the Port, including the Airport Business Park.

Gallery

See also

 List of ports in the United States
 Port of Redwood City
 United States container ports

References

External links

Port of Oakland Official website
Coming Soon, Economists Hope: Big Spending on Roads, Bridges and Ports

Economy of Oakland, California
Oakland
San Francisco Bay
Transportation in Oakland, California
Geography of Oakland, California
Politics of Oakland, California
Oakland